Masterton Ure (3 April 1777 – 10 March 1863) was a Scottish lawyer and Tory politician, serving as the Member of Parliament for Weymouth and Melcombe Regis.

Early life 
Ure was born to the Rev. Robert Ure, a minister in Airth, Stirling. He attended the University of Glasgow.

Political career 
Ure made his maiden speech on the topic of the West Indies on 9 March 1818.

Ure was opposed to Catholic Emancipation, Jewish Emancipation, parliamentary reform and was a supporter of slavery.

Death 
Ure died on 10 March 1863, aged 85, in Middlesex, London leaving his estate divided up between his nephews and nieces.

References 

1777 births
1863 deaths
Tory members of the Parliament of the United Kingdom
Alumni of the University of Glasgow
UK MPs 1812–1818
UK MPs 1818–1820
UK MPs 1820–1826
UK MPs 1826–1830
UK MPs 1830–1831
UK MPs 1831–1832
Members of the Parliament of the United Kingdom for Weymouth and Melcombe Regis
Politicians from London